Robert Brickey  (born December 26, 1967) is an American basketball coach who is currently the head coach of the Fayetteville Stingers
of The Basketball League. Previously he was the head coach of the Raleigh Firebirds.

High school career
Brickey attended E.E. Smith High School in Fayetteville, North Carolina, and as a junior led the Golden Bulls to the championship game, where they were defeated by Hunter Huss High School. In 1986, as a senior, Brickey was named North Carolina Mr. Basketball.

College career

After graduating, he went on to play basketball at Duke from 1986 to 1990, where he was a part of three final four teams and started in the national championship game in 1990.  He served as team captain in 1990 and received first team All-Atlantic Coast Conference (ACC) Tournament honors in 1988.

In the Summer of 1987, Robert Brickey won a silver medal with Team USA at the FIBA Under 19 World Championship. The Larry Brown led group finished the tournament 5–2, and lost the gold medal game to a loaded Yugoslavian team that included Vlade Divac, Dino Rada, and Toni Kukoc. On a squad that included Larry Johnson and Gary Payton, Brickey saw significant playing time, and averaged 7.0 points per game.

Coaching career

From 2000 to 2002 he was an assistant at Army. He moved SMU (2002–04) and James Madison (2004–05), before taking the head coaching job at Shaw University (2005–08). Following his departure from Shaw, he was the assistant director of basketball operations at Duke University (2008–09), assistant coach at North Carolina Central University (2009–2011), head coach of the NBL Canada squad Oshawa Power (2011–2012), and assistant coach at Fayetteville State (2013–15).

In 2018, Brickey was hired as the head coach of the Raleigh Firebirds, who begin play in 2019 as part of North American Premier Basketball (NAPB). 

After sitting out the 2022 season, he was hired as the head coach of the Fayetteville Stingers for the 2023 season.

References

1967 births
Living people
American expatriate basketball people in Canada
American men's basketball coaches
American men's basketball players
Army Black Knights men's basketball coaches
Basketball coaches from North Carolina
Basketball players from North Carolina
Duke Blue Devils men's basketball players
James Madison Dukes men's basketball coaches
North American Premier Basketball coaches
North Carolina Central Eagles men's basketball coaches
Shaw Bears men's basketball coaches
SMU Mustangs men's basketball coaches
Sportspeople from Fayetteville, North Carolina
Mississauga Power coaches